BlackStartup was a crowdfunding platform that allows entrepreneurs to market their business or project and solicit backers for funding. BlackStartup is the first crowdfunding site focused on entrepreneurship in the African-American community.

The site was founded in 2013 by a group of Morehouse College graduates who are also members of Omega Psi Phi fraternity.

As of August 2017, the site is offline and up for sale.

References

Defunct crowdfunding platforms of the United States
Microfinance